Jimmy Davidson (23 October 1942 in Armagh – 28 April 2007) was an Irish rugby union player and coach.

Davidson managed the Irish national rugby union team from 1987 until 1990. Davidson made his Ireland debut against France at Lansdowne Road on 25 January 1969 and went on to win six caps for Ireland, his last in 1976. He took over as coach of the Ulster in 1983 and guided them to three inter-provincial titles before succeeding Mick Doyle as Ireland coach in 1987. Davidson led Ireland to five victories during his three year stint with the national side.
He died in 2007 of cancer.

References 

1942 births
2007 deaths
Irish rugby union coaches
Irish rugby union players
Ireland international rugby union players
Ireland national rugby union team coaches
Rugby union players from County Armagh
Rugby union flankers
People from Armagh (city)
Ulster Rugby players
Ulster Rugby non-playing staff